Ameletus ludens is a species of combmouthed minnow mayfly in the family Ameletidae. It is found in North America.

References

Mayflies
Articles created by Qbugbot
Insects described in 1905